A Dead Certainty is a 1920 British silent sports drama film directed by George Dewhurst and starring Gregory Scott, Poppy Wyndham and Cameron Carr. It was based on a novel by Nathaniel Gould. A jockey comes under pressure from his girlfriend's relations to fix a horse race.

Cast
 Gregory Scott ...  Arthur Dunbar 
 Poppy Wyndham ...  Pat Stone 
 Cameron Carr ...  Henry Stone 
 Harry Royston ...  Martin Mills 
 Mary Masters ...  Mrs. Woodruff 
 Wallace Bosco

References

Bibliography
 Low, Rachael. The History of British Film, Volume 4 1918-1929. Routledge, 1997.

External links

1920 films
British silent feature films
British sports drama films
1920s sports drama films
Films directed by George Dewhurst
Films based on British novels
British horse racing films
British black-and-white films
1920 drama films
1920s English-language films
1920s British films
Silent sports drama films